The Bhauma dynasty, also known as Kara dynasty, ruled in eastern India between 8th and 10th centuries. Their kingdom, called Toshala (IAST: Toṣala), included parts of present-day Odisha.

By the last quarter of the 8th century, the Bhauma-Karas had gained control of the former Shailodbhava territory. The early rulers of the dynasties followed Buddhism, and its later rulers followed Shaivism and Vaishnavism. The dynasty, whose rulers included five women, was supplanted by the Bhanjas and the Somavamshis in the 10th century.

Origin 

The origin of the Bhauma-Kara family is not certain. The earliest records of the dynasty name their family as "Bhauma". "Kara" is first mentioned as a dynastic name in an inscription of the dynasty's sixth king, Shubhakara II. The names of all the male kings ended in "-kara", which may explain the usage of "Kara" as a family name.

Some scholars, such as Binayak Misra and R. C. Majumdar, argued that the dynasty was associated with a tribe called Bhauma, whose members originally lived on the Mahendra mountain. This theory is based on the occurrence of the phrase "Mahendra Bhauma" in a manuscript of Vishnu Purana. The text also associates the Bhauma tribe with a king called Guha, which according to Misra, explains the name of dynasty's capital - Guhadevapataka (or Guheshvarapataka). Critics of this theory point out that the term "Mahendra Bhauma" occurs in only one manuscript of Vishnu Purana, and its meaning is not clear. Moreover, the Vayu Purana suggests that king Guha lived in the 4th century, while the Bhauma-Kara rule started in the 8th century: the gap between the two cannot be explained satisfactorily. Finally, if the Bhauma-Karas were really descended from a reputed legendary king like Guha, they would not have failed to mention this king as their ancestor in their records.

Misra also believed that the Bhauma tribe was connected with the ancient "Utkala race", because the Chaurasi copper-plate inscription of king Shivakara II states that he belonged to the "Bhauma lineage of the Utkala family". However, according to Biswarup Das, "Utkala" here is a geographic designation indicating the family's contemporary residence.

One theory connects the Bhauma-Karas with the Bhumij tribe. N. K. Sahu and some other scholars connected the Bhauma-Karas to the Bhuyan tribe of northern Odisha or the Bhuyan aristocrats. This theory is based on the similarity of the words "Bhuyan" and "Bhauma". However, this evidence is not strong, as several similar-sounding words are derived from the Sanskrit word bhu (land). Another point cited in support of this theory is the fact that among some Bhuyan aristocratic families, the eldest son was named after his grandfather. This also appears to be true for the Bhauma-Kara kings. However, in these Bhuyan families, the second son was named after the great grandfather, a tradition not followed in the Bhauma-Kara family. Moreover, there is no evidence that the ancestors of the Bhuyans ruled any area before the 10th century.

Yet another theory connects the family to the legendary Bhauma dynasty of Pragjyotisha (modern Assam). According to some ancient texts, the Bhaumas of Pragjyotisha descended from Naraka (alias Bhauma), who was a son of the god Vishnu. Similarly, the 15th century writer Sarala Dasa, in his Odia language version of Mahabharata, states that "Vishnukara" was the founder of the Kara family. According to this theory, the Bhauma-Karas originally served as feudatories to the Mlechchha ruler Harsha, who may have captured a part of Odisha. However, this theory is not supported by any concrete evidence either.

History

Early rulers 

The Bhauma-Kara inscriptions are dated in the years of an unspecified calendar era, simply called samvat (Sanskrit for calendar era). Historian Krishna Chandra Panigrahi believed that this era begins from year 736 CE, and marks the beginning of the Bhauma-Kara rule. However, Dineshchandra Sircar dated the beginning of this era to 831 CE, based on his analysis of the astronomical data in the Dashapalla inscription of the Bhauma-Kara feudatory Shatrubhanja II. Richard G. Salomon calls Sircar's suggestion as most convincing, although he notes that it is not conclusive.

The earlier Bhauma-Kara kings appear to have ruled the northern Toshali area, contemporaneously with the Shailodbhavas, who ruled the southern Kongoda region. The dynasty probably ruled most of the coastal Odisha by the time of king Shivakara I (c. 756 or 786). According to the Ganjam inscription of the Shvetaka Ganga king Jayavarmadeva, Shivakara I conquered Kongoda and the northern part of Kalinga. The Talcher inscription of his descendant Shivakara III states that he defeated the king of Rāḍha (in present-day West Bengal), and married the daughter of the defeated king.

Pala and Rashtrakuta invasions 

Shubhakara I (c. 790), according to his Neulpur inscription, crushed a revolt by his relatives, who had claimed the throne. Between 790 and 829, during the reigns of Shubhakara I and his elder son Shivakara II, a series of Rashtrakuta and Pala invasions weakened and disintegrated the Bhauma kingdom.

Shantikara I, the younger son of Shubhakara I, married Tribhuvana-Mahadevi I, a daughter of the Western Ganga king  Rajamalla. The Dhenkanal inscription of Tribhuvana-Mahadevi I (c. 846) suggests that the Bhauma-Kara kingdom was in a bad shape before her father Rajmalla put an end to the Rashtrakuta-Pala domination. She reunified the kingdom, but the family probably never regained its former power. Her Talcher inscription suggests that she abdicated the throne when her grandson Shantikara II became an adult.

Internal strife 

The Bhauma-Kara family appears to have suffered from internal strifes starting around c. 880, which gradually led to its downfall. The reign of Shubhakara IV, the dynasty's first known Shaivite king, lasted for less than five years (c. 881-884). He was succeeded by his brother Shivakara III, whose reign lasted for around nine years.

The next ruler was Tribhuvana-Mahadevi II (c. 894), who was the queen of Shubhakara IV. Her inscriptions falsely claim that Shivakara III died heirless, a deliberate attempt to ignore the claims of her nephews to the throne. Most modern scholars believe that she acquired the throne with the help of her father Janmejaya I, who was a ruler of the neighbouring Somavamshi dynasty. A Brahmeswara Temple inscription suggests that Janmejaya killed the king of the Odra country. Panigrahi identified the slain king as Shivakara III, but other historians identify him as a rebel Bhanja vassal of Janmejaya. The reign of Tribhuvana-Mahadevi II was probably very short, as her ascension may have  been disputed by the court factions. The records of the later Bhauma-Kara kings do not mention her reign, which suggests that she was not recognized as a legitimate ruler by the sons of Shivakara III, who probably set up parallel governments.

At least five rulers claimed the Bhauma-Kara throne during 894-923, which suggests that the kingdom had become unstable. Tribhuvana-Mahadevi II was succeeded by two of her nephews Shantikara III and Shubhakara V. Subsequently, Gauri-Mahadevi, the queen of Shubhakara V, controlled the kingdom, probably as a regent for their young daughter Dandi-Mahadevi. After Dandi (c. 916 or 923), her step-mother Vakula-Mahadevi (another queen of Shubhakara V) ascended the throne. Vakula's paternal family may have helped her dethrone Dandi. Her rule was followed by Dharma-Mahadevi, a queen of Shantikara III. These queens assumed the imperial titles Parama-Maheshvari, Parama- Bhattarika, Maharajadhiraja, and Parameshvari.

It appears that the neighbouring Somavamshi and Bhanja dynasties attempted to take over the Bhauma-Kara kingdom, leading to dissensions and political intrigues. According to historian Krishna Chandra Panigrahi, the Bhanjas of Khinjali married two of their princesses (Vakula and Dharma) into the Bhauma-Kara family, and later controlled the Bhauma-Kara throne through them. The Bhauma-Kara territory ultimately came under the control of the Somavamshis.

Territory 

The Bhauma-Kara kingdom was called Toshala, a name believed to be derived from Toshali, the ancient capital of Kalinga. Their land grant inscriptions suggest that in its palmy days their kingdom included a major part of Odisha, as well as the Midnapore district of West Bengal. A part of this territory was administered by their semi-autonomous feudatories. These feudatories included the Gangas of Shvetaka, the Shulkis of Kodalaka, the Tungas of Yamagartta, the Nandodbhavas of Jayapura, and the Bhanjas (of Khigingakotta, Khinjali, and Vajulvaka).

The Bhauma-Kara period saw the beginning of the unification of historically distinct regions such as Odra, Toshala, Kongoda and Utkala. The kingdom was divided into administrative units called the mandalas (revenue divisions), vishayas (districts), khandas (sub-divisions), and villages (Patakas, Patikas and gramas).

Their capital was located at Guhadevapataka (or Guheshvarapataka), identified with modern Gohiratikar (or Gohiratikra) in Jajpur district. This was either a new name for the city that was earlier called Viraja, or was a new city built in the vicinity of ancient Viraja. The later Somavamshi rulers moved their capital from Yayatinagara (modern Binka) to Guheshvarapataka, and renamed the city Abhinava-Yayatinagara ("the new city of Yayati").

Religion 

The Bhauma-Kara kings were tolerant towards Buddhism as well as Shaivism. Shubhakara I, a Buddhist, married Madhava-devi, who was a Shaivite. Shubhakara III, also a Buddhist, granted a portion of the Noddilo village to the Pulindeshvara shrine dedicated to Vaidyanatha-bhattaraka (an aspect of Shiva), as attested by his Hindol inscription. Shivakara III, a Shaivite, granted two villages to a Buddhist temple in Jayashrama-vihara. According to the Dhenkanal inscription of Tribhuvana-Mahadevi I, her predecessors Shivakara I and Shantikara I "exhausted treasures of their vast empire on religious works in order to enlighten their country and others", and constructed several mathas, monasteries and temples.

Buddhism 
The first three kings of the dynasty - Keshmankara, Shivakara I (alias Unmattasimha) and Shubhakara I were Buddhists. At least two of their successors - Shivakara II and Shubhakara III - were also Buddhists. The Bhauma-Kara patronage played an important role in the growth of Ratnagiri as a major Buddhist centre. The Bhauma-Kara territory also included other important Buddhist sites of Lalitagiri, Pushpagiri, and Udayagiri. Their rule saw a gradual shift from Mahayana to Vajrayana in the region.

According to the Chinese records, Shubhakara-simha, a former king of Odra, arrived at the Tang capital in 716, at the invitation of  emperor Xuanzong. He bought several Buddhist texts with him, and helped popularize Vajrayana in China. This Shubhakara-simha may have been an ancestor of the Bhauma-Kara kings.

The Chinese records also state that, in 795, the Tang emperor Dezong received an autographed manuscript as a gift from the king of the Odra country. The manuscript contained the last section of the Buddhist texts Avatamsaka Sutra and the Gandavyuha Sutra. The Indian king can be identified as either Shivakara I or his son Shubhakara I, who ruled the Odra region at the time. In the 9th century, the Buddhist monk Prajna, who had earlier visited several important Buddhist sites including Nalanda, settled in a monastery in Odra. This suggests the Buddhist monasteries of Odra had become reputed throughout the Buddhist world by this time.

According to the Baudh inscription of Tribhuvana-Mahadevi II, Shubhakara I (c. 790) constructed lofty stone viharas. During his reign, the Buddhist leader dedicated an image of Padmapani, as attested by an inscription on the image. According to a Dhauli cave inscription, Bhimata and Bhatta Loyamaka constructed a monastery named Arghyaka Varatika in the Bhauma year 93 (c. 829), during the reign of Shantikara I. Another inscription of Bhimata, who was the son of a famous physician, has been found at the Ganeshagumpha cave in Udayagiri.

Brahmanism 

The later part of the Bhaumakara rule marked the revival of Brahmanism in Odisha, which may have resulted from the royal attempts to curb the unconventional activities being carried out in name of Tantric Buddhism (Vajrayana). Madhava-devi, the queen of Shubhakara I constructed a temple dedicated to Madhaveshvara (Shiva), and appointed a Shaivite acharya (religious leader) for conducting worship.

Queen Tribhuvana-Mahadevi I (c. 846), whose father appears to have played an important role in evicting the Rashtrakuta and Pala invaders from the kingdom, was a Vaishnavite.

The tenth king Shubhakara IV (c. 881) is the earliest known Bhauma-Kara ruler to have called himself a devotee of Shiva (Parama-Maheshvara). The subsequent rulers of the family were all Shaivites. Nearly all the temples constructed by the family were Shiva shrines, the only exception being the Vaitala Deula temple dedicated to the goddess Chamunda.

List of rulers 

The Bhauma-Kara rulers are known from their copper-plate inscriptions, which are dated in their own calendar era, as well as in the regnal years of the issuing rulers. These dates are further corroborated by records of other dynasties, such as the Somavamshis. The following is a list of Bhauma rulers, with approximately regnal dates (in CE), assuming 736 CE as the start of the Bhauma-Kara calendar era.

Inscriptions 

The following inscriptions of Bhauma-Karas and their feudatories have been discovered:

Issued by the Bhauma-Kara family

Issued by the Bhauma-Kara feudatories

References

Bibliography

External links 
 The Bhauma karas of Orissa by Biswarup Das
 Orissa Under the Bhauma Kings (1934) by Binayak Misra. Although outdated, the book contains useful descriptions of the dynasty's inscriptions

Dynasties of India
History of Odisha
Buddhist dynasties of India